The arrondissement of Louhans is an arrondissement of France in the Saône-et-Loire department in the Bourgogne-Franche-Comté region. It has 88 communes.

Composition

The communes of the arrondissement of Louhans, and their INSEE codes, are:

 L'Abergement-de-Cuisery (71001)
 L'Abergement-Sainte-Colombe (71002)
 Authumes (71013)
 Bantanges (71018)
 Baudrières (71023)
 Beaurepaire-en-Bresse (71027)
 Beauvernois (71028)
 Bellevesvre (71029)
 Bosjean (71044)
 Bouhans (71045)
 Branges (71056)
 Brienne (71061)
 Bruailles (71064)
 Champagnat (71079)
 La Chapelle-Naude (71092)
 La Chapelle-Saint-Sauveur (71093)
 La Chapelle-Thècle (71097)
 Charette-Varennes (71101)
 La Chaux (71121)
 Condal (71143)
 Cuiseaux (71157)
 Cuisery (71158)
 Dampierre-en-Bresse (71168)
 Devrouze (71173)
 Diconne (71175)
 Dommartin-lès-Cuiseaux (71177)
 Le Fay (71196)
 Flacey-en-Bresse (71198)
 Frangy-en-Bresse (71205)
 La Frette (71206)
 Fretterans (71207)
 Frontenard (71208)
 Frontenaud (71209)
 La Genête (71213)
 Huilly-sur-Seille (71234)
 Joudes (71243)
 Jouvençon (71244)
 Juif (71246)
 Lays-sur-le-Doubs (71254)
 Lessard-en-Bresse (71256)
 Loisy (71261)
 Louhans (71263)
 Ménetreuil (71293)
 Mervans (71295)
 Le Miroir (71300)
 Montagny-près-Louhans (71303)
 Montcony (71311)
 Montjay (71314)
 Montpont-en-Bresse (71318)
 Montret (71319)
 Mouthier-en-Bresse (71326)
 Ormes (71332)
 Ouroux-sur-Saône (71336)
 Pierre-de-Bresse (71351)
 Le Planois (71352)
 Pourlans (71357)
 La Racineuse (71364)
 Rancy (71365)
 Ratenelle (71366)
 Ratte (71367)
 Romenay (71373)
 Sagy (71379)
 Saillenard (71380)
 Saint-André-en-Bresse (71386)
 Saint-Bonnet-en-Bresse (71396)
 Saint-Christophe-en-Bresse (71398)
 Sainte-Croix-en-Bresse (71401)
 Saint-Étienne-en-Bresse (71410)
 Saint-Germain-du-Bois (71419)
 Saint-Germain-du-Plain (71420)
 Saint-Martin-du-Mont (71454)
 Saint-Usuge (71484)
 Saint-Vincent-en-Bresse (71489)
 Savigny-en-Revermont (71506)
 Savigny-sur-Seille (71508)
 Sens-sur-Seille (71514)
 Serley (71516)
 Serrigny-en-Bresse (71519)
 Simandre (71522)
 Simard (71523)
 Sornay (71528)
 Le Tartre (71534)
 Thurey (71538)
 Torpes (71541)
 Tronchy (71548)
 Varennes-Saint-Sauveur (71558)
 Vérissey (71568)
 Vincelles (71580)

History

The arrondissement of Louhans was created in 1800, disbanded in 1926 and restored in 1942. In January 2017 it gained seven communes from the arrondissement of Chalon-sur-Saône and two communes from the arrondissement of Mâcon.

As a result of the reorganisation of the cantons of France which came into effect in 2015, the borders of the cantons are no longer related to the borders of the arrondissements. The cantons of the arrondissement of Louhans were, as of January 2015:

 Beaurepaire-en-Bresse
 Cuiseaux
 Cuisery
 Louhans
 Montpont-en-Bresse
 Montret
 Pierre-de-Bresse
 Saint-Germain-du-Bois

References

Louhans